Iran participated in the 1970 Asian Games held in the capital city of Bangkok. This country is ranked 4th with 9 gold medals in this edition of the Asiad.

Medal summary

Medal table

Medalists

Athletics

  Gold
 Teymour Ghiassi - Men's high jump
  Silver
 Jalal Keshmiri - Men's discus throw 
 Jalal Keshmiri - Men's shot put

Boxing

  Silver
 Omran Khatami - Men's +81 kg
  Bronze 
 Mohammad Sarehkhani - Men's 71 kg
 Gholamhossein Pakmanesh - Men's 75 kg

Cycling

Road
  Silver
 Team - Men's team time trial
 Team roster
 Hassan Arianfar
 Asghar Doroudi
 Khosrow Haghgosha
 Hossein Baharloo

Track
  Bronze 
 Team - Men's team pursuit
 Team roster
 Khosrow Haghgosha
 Manouchehr Daneshmand
 Hossein Baharloo
 Asghar Doroudi

Weightlifting

  Gold
 Mohammad Nassiri - Men's 56 kg
 Nasrollah Dehnavi - Men's 67.5 kg
  Silver
 Daniel Giorgiz - Men's 75 kg
  Bronze 
 Mohammadreza Nasehi - Men's 52 kg
 Ebrahim Pourdejam - Men's 90 kg
 Houshang Kargarnejad - Men's 110 kg

Wrestling

Freestyle
  Gold
 Ebrahim Javadi - Men's 48 kg
 Mohammad Ghorbani - Men's 52 kg
 Shamseddin Seyed-Abbasi - Men's 62 kg
 Abdollah Movahed - Men's 68 kg
 Dariush Zakeri - Men's 90 kg
 Eskandar Filabi - Men's +100 kg
  Silver
 Mohammad Farhangdoust - Men's 74 kg
 Ali Hajiloo - Men's 82 kg
  Bronze 
 Abolfazl Anvari - Men's 100 kg

References

  Iran Olympic Committee - Asian Games Medalists
  Iran National Sports Organization - Asian Games Medalists

Nations at the 1970 Asian Games
1970
Asian Games